Heyck is a surname. Notable people with the surname include:

Eduard Heyck (1862–1941), German cultural historian, editor, writer, and poet
Hans Heyck (1891–1972), German writer

See also
Heck (surname)